Geraea is a genus of the family Asteraceae from the southwestern United States and northwestern Mexico, commonly called the desert sunflower.

 Species
 Geraea canescens Torr. & A.Gray - California, Arizona, Nevada, Utah
 Geraea viscida (A.Gray) S.F.Blake - California (San Diego + Imperial Counties), Baja California

References

External links
 Jepson Manual Treatment
 USDA Plants Profile

Heliantheae
Asteraceae genera
Flora of North America